The Albion Hotel is a former pub in the suburb of Balmain, in the Inner West of Sydney, in the state of New South Wales, Australia. It is currently operated as a trattoria, café and private residence:

History
The pub was built in 1860 on the corner of Darling and Ann Streets to cater for workers from nearby Mort Bay. In 1876 the building became a grocery, perhaps due to the competition of the nearby and larger Pacific Hotel and London Hotel. Its licence was transferred to the Unity Hall Hotel, then on the corner of Nicholson and Darling Streets East Balmain, now Oddfellows Hall, until 1910, when it lapsed.

In 2000 it became a trattoria and café, currently called Ciao Thyme.

See also

 List of public houses in Australia

References

Further reading
 Davidson, B; Hamey, K; Nicholls, D; Called To The Bar - 150 Years of pubs in Balmain & Rozelle, The Balmain Association, 1991, .

Pubs in Sydney
1860 establishments in Australia
Hotel buildings completed in 1860
Tourist attractions in New South Wales
Balmain, New South Wales
Former pubs in Australia